This is a list of Nigerian writers.

A

Chris Abani (born 1966), novelist, playwright and poet
Faridah Àbíké-Íyímídé (born 1998), novelist 
Chinua Achebe (1930–2013), novelist, poet and critic
Catherine Obianuju Acholonu (born 1951), academic
Ayobami Adebayo (born 1988), novelist
Remi Adedeji (born 1937), children's writer and academic editor
Abimbola Adelakun, novelist
Sade Adeniran, novelist and filmmaker
Saheed Aderinto (born 1979), author and academic
Akin Adesokan, novelist and scholar
Toyin Adewale-Gabriel (born 1969), poet
Tomi Adeyemi (born 1993), novelist and writing coach
Chimamanda Ngozi Adichie (born 1977), novelist and poet
S. A. Afolabi (born 1966), novelist, short-story writer
Ifeoma Aggrey-Fynn (d. 2015), writer
Tolu Ajayi (born 1946), poet and writer of fiction
Tolu Akinyemi, writer, poet
Dami Ajayi, poet, essayist
Yemi Ajibade (1929–2013), playwright and actor
Audrey Ajose (born 1937?), journalist and juvenile fiction writer
Uwem Akpan (born 1971), Jesuit priest and writer
 Henry Akubuiro, journalist and novelist
Hauwa Ali (died 1995), novelist
Akilu Aliyu (1918–1998), poet
Zaynab Alkali (born 1950), novelist, short-story writer and academic
T. M. Aluko (1918–2010), novelist and autobiographer
Elechi Amadi (1934–2016), novelist
Ifi Amadiume (born 1947), poet, anthropologist and essayist
Karen King-Aribisala, short-story writer, novelist and academic
Yemisi Aribisala (born 1973), essayist and food memoirist
Nana Asmau (1793–1864)
Odafe Atogun, writer
Sefi Atta (born 1964), novelist, short-story writer and playwright
Adaeze Atuegwu (born 1977), novelist and playwright 
Theophilus Olabode Avoseh (born 1908), historian
Uche Azikiwe (born 1947), author
Nnorom Azuonye (born 1967), theatre director, playwright and poet

B
Rotimi Babatunde, playwright
Esther Bali, writer of folktale stories, playwright
Biyi Bandele (1967–2022), novelist, playwright, filmmaker
Bunmi Banjo (born 1977)
A. Igoni Barrett (born 1979), novelist, short-story writer
Lindsay Barrett (born 1941), poet, novelist, essayist, playwright, journalist
Olumbe Bassir (1919–2001)
Muhammed Bello
Philip Begho (born 1956), dramatist, short-story writer, poet
T. J. Benson, novelist and short-story writer
Omoseye Bolaji (1964–2022) 
Natasha Bowen, novelist and teacher
Oyinkan Braithwaite (born 1988), novelist

C
Chin Ce (born 1966)
Chinweizu (born 1943), critic, essayist, poet, journalist
John Pepper Clark (1935–2020), poet, playwright
Dandy Jackson Chukwudi, novelist, short story writer
Teju Cole (born 1975), novelist, essayist
Samuel Ajayi Crowther (1807–1891), linguist, translator, diarist, explorer, writer

D
Usman dan Fodio (1754–1817), poet, political and societal theorist, law and jurisprudence writer
Abi Dare
Jude Dibia (born 1975)
Antera Duke, diarist

E
Michael Echeruo (born 1937), poet, critic
Amatoritsero (Godwin) Ede
Chike Frankie Edozien
Philip Effiong (1925–2003)
Oghenechovwe Donald Ekpeki
Cyprian Ekwensi (1921–2007), novelist, short-story writer
Buchi Emecheta (1944–2017), novelist
E. Nolue Emenanjo (born 1943)
Akwaeke Emezi (born 1987)
Olaudah Equiano (c. 1745–97)
Rosemary Esehagu (born 1981)
Femi Euba (born 1942), dramatist
Dickson Ekhaguere, playwright

F
Daniel Olorunfemi Fagunwa (1903–1963), novelist
Adebayo Faleti (1930–2017)
Toyin Falola (born 1953)
Dan Fulani
Bilkisu Funtuwa
Flora Nwapa (1931–1993)

G
Godspower Oboido (born 1988), poet and essayist
Ukawsaw Gronniosaw (1705–1775), autobiographer

H
Helon Habila (born 1967), novelist
Obo Aba Hisanjani (born 1949), poet
Helen Oyeyemi (born 1984), novelist

I
Abubakar Adam Ibrahim (born 1979)
Emmanuel Iduma (born 1989), novelist, essayist, and academic
Jordan Ifueko (born 1993), novelist
Nnanna Ikpo, novelist
Ejikeme Ikwunze
Abubakar Imam (1911–1981)
Eghosa Imasuen (born 1976)
Tade Ipadeola (born 1970), poet
Akinwunmi Isola, playwright, dramatist and scholar
Uzodinma Iweala (born 1982)
Festus Iyayi (born 1947)

J
John Jea (1773–?)
Elnathan John (born 1982)
Samuel Johnson (1846–1901)

K
Toni Kan (born 1971)
Farooq Kperogi (born 1973), author, columnist, journalism professor

L
Duro Ladipo (1931–1978)
Abimbola Lagunju (born 1960)
Logan February (born 1999)

M
Amina Mama (born 1958)
Sarah Ladipo Manyika (born 1968), novelist, short story writer, essayist
Oliver Mbamara 
Sebastian Okechukwu Mezu (born 1941)
Dele Momodu (born 1960)
John Munonye (1929–1999)

N
Niran Adedokun, novelist, journalist and columnist
Okey Ndibe, novelist, columnist, journalist and scholar
Echezonachukwu Nduka (born 1989), poet, classical pianist
Uche Nduka (born 1963), poet
Martina Nwakoby (born 1937)
Nkem Nwankwo (1936–2001), novelist, poet
Flora Nwapa (1931–1993), novelist
Adaobi Tricia Nwaubani (born 1976), novelist, humorist, essayist and journalist
Onuora Nzekwu (1928–2017)
Onyeka Nwelue (born 1988)
Chuma Nwokolo (born 1963), writer, poet, humorist, essayist and lawyer
Abdul Rasheed Na'Allah (born 1962), writer, poet, scholar and performer

O
Chigozie Obioma (born 1986), novelist
Obiwu (born 1962), poet, theorist
Moses Ochonu, academic, historian
Ike Odimegwu
Jeffrey Obomeghie, editor and writer
Josephat Obi Oguejiofor
Olu Oguibe (born 1964)
Ike Oguine  
Molara Ogundipe (born 1949)
Wole Oguntokun, playwright
Tanure Ojaide (born 1948), poet, critic
Bayo Ojikutu (born 1971), novelist, essayist, short story writer
Gabriel Okara (1921–2019), poet
Chioma Okereke, novelist, poet
Christopher Okigbo (1932–1967), poet
Julie Okoh (born 1947), playwright
Nnedi Okorafor (born 1974), writer of fantasy and science fiction
Ifeoma Okoye (born 1937), novelist
Chinelo Okparanta (born 1981), novelist and short-story writer
Isidore Okpewho (born 1941), novelist, critic
Ben Okri (born 1959), poet, novelist
Suyi Davies Okungbowa (born 1989), fantasy and science fiction author
Afolabi Olabimtan (1932–2003)
Olatubosun Oladapo (born 1943), poet, playwright
Ukamaka Olisakwe (born 1982)
Simbo Olorunfemi, poet, journalist
Kole Omotosho (born 1943), novelist 
Kola Onadipe (1922–1988)
Nuzo Onoh (born 1962), African horror author
Chibundu Onuzo (born 1991)
Osonye Tess Onwueme (born 1955)
Nduka Onwuegbute (born 1969)
Ifeoma Onyefulu (born 1959)
Cheluchi Onyemelukwe-Onuobia
Bukola Oriola (born 1976)
Romeo Oriogun
Dennis Osadebay (1911–1995), poet
Femi Osofisan (born 1946)
E. C. Osondu, short-story writer, novelist
Ayodele Olofintuade (born 1970s), novelist 
Niyi Osundare (born 1947), poet, dramatist and literary critic
Onyinye Ough
Helen Ovbiagele (born 1944), novelist
Oyèrónkẹ́ Oyěwùmí

R
Remi Sonaiya (born 1955)
Remi Raji (born 1961), poet, academic
Ola Rotimi (1938–2000), novelist, theatre director and  playwright

S
Ken Saro-Wiwa (1941–1995), playwright, novelist, poet
Mabel Segun (born 1930), poet, playwright
Lola Shoneyin (born 1974), novelist, poet
Zulu Sofola (1935–1995), playwright
Bode Sowande (born 1948), playwright
Wole Soyinka (born 1934), playwright, poet, novelist; Nobel laureate, (1986)
Ibrahim Sheme (born 1968), novelist, poet, publisher

T
Amos Tutuola (1920–1997), novelist
Kola Tubosun (born 1981), poet, essayist and linguist

U
Obiora Udechukwu (born 1946), poet
Gracy Ukala (born 1946), novelist
Adaora Lily Ulasi (born 1932), novelist
Uchechukwu Peter Umezurike (born 1975), poet
Chika Unigwe (born 1974), novelist
Sam Ukala (born 1948), playwright, prose fiction writer and poet

V
Mamman Jiya Vatsa (1944–1986), poet
Jumoke Verissimo (born 1979), poet

W
Ken Wiwa (1968–2016), biographer
Molara Wood (born 1969), short-story writer, journalist

Y
Balaraba Ramat Yakubu (born 1959), Hausa-language writer

See also
 List of African writers by country
 List of Nigerian poets
 Hausa literature
 Yoruba literature
 Igbo literature
 Efik literature
 Third Generation of Nigerian writers

References

Nigeria
Writers